Silvana Asturias (born 27 August 1953) is a Guatemalan former swimmer. She competed in four events at the 1968 Summer Olympics.

References

1953 births
Living people
Guatemalan female swimmers
Olympic swimmers of Guatemala
Swimmers at the 1968 Summer Olympics
Sportspeople from Guatemala City